Mae is an unincorporated community in Grant County, in the U.S. state of Washington.

History
A post office called Mae was established in 1906, and remained in operation until 1955. Mae Shoemaker, an early postmaster, gave the community her name.

References

Unincorporated communities in Grant County, Washington
Unincorporated communities in Washington (state)